Sone See Chin Moe Tain Myar is a 2017 Burmese thriller drama television series. It aired on MRTV-4, from June 7 to August 7, 2017, on Mondays to Fridays at 19:15 for 43 episodes.

Cast
May Myint Mo as Ngwe La Min. Other life names are Mya Darli, Htake Htar Saw Latt.
Sithu Win as Thiha Sithu
Aung Yay Chan as Akarit. Other life name is Datepa.
Khay Sett Thwin as Hlaine Ei Ei Cho. Other life name is A Saw Min Hla.
Than Than Soe as Daw Cho
Min Oo as U Agga Kyaw
Khine Hnin Wai as Daw Pann Nyo. Other life name is Daw Aozar
Ju Jue Kay as Sin Shwe War. Other life name is O Kaung Mo
Zin Myo as Kyaw Min. Other life name is Phoe Tay
Zaw Oo as Myo Sar Min

References

Burmese television series
2017 television series debuts
2017 television series endings
MRTV (TV network) original programming